Margery de Burgh, was a Norman-Irish noblewoman and wife of Theobald Butler, 3rd Chief Butler of Ireland.

Family and lineage 
Margery de Burgh was born in Galway, Ireland, the eldest daughter of Richard Mor de Burgh, Lord of Connacht and Justiciar of Ireland, and Egidia de Lacy. She had three brothers and three sisters, including Walter de Burgh, 1st Earl of Ulster.

Marriage and issue 
In 1242, Margery married Theobald Butler, 3rd Chief Butler of Ireland (1224–1248), the eldest son of Theobald le Botiller, Chief Butler of Ireland and his first wife, Joan, daughter of Geoffrey de Marsh (or Mareys), Knt., Justiciar of Ireland.

Margery and Theobald had two children:
 Theobald Butler, 4th Chief Butler of Ireland (1242- 26 September 1285), who married, in 1268, Joan FitzJohn ( died 26 May 1303), daughter of John Fitzgeoffrey, Justiciar of Ireland, and Isabel Bigod. Joan was a younger sister of his uncle's wife, Aveline FitzJohn. The marriage produced issue, from whom descended the Earls of Ormond.
 Elizabeth Butler (Le Botiller)

Death 
Margery's husband died 26 December 1248. He was buried before 3 August 1248 at Arklow, Co. Limerick. On 27 April 1250, she made a fine to remarry.

Margery de Burgh died on 1 March 1252.

References 

13th-century deaths
People from County Galway
Nobility from County Limerick
13th-century Irish women
Margery
Margery
Irish nobility
Year of birth unknown
1224 births